Sceloporus licki, the Cape arboreal spiny lizard, is a species of lizard in the family Phrynosomatidae. It is endemic to the Sierra de la Laguna on the southern Baja California Peninsula in Mexico.

References

Sceloporus
Endemic reptiles of Mexico
Reptiles described in 1895
Taxa named by John Van Denburgh
Endemic fauna of the Baja California Peninsula